Juan Ignacio Pacchini (born 17 June 2000) is an Argentine professional footballer who plays as a midfielder for Independiente.

Career
Born in Rafael Calzada, Pacchini started his career with local teams; including 9 de Julio Adrogué. He soon joined Brown, before departing in 2013 to head to Independiente. After seven years passing through their youth system, Pacchini made his breakthrough into first-team football towards the back end of 2020. After being an unused substitute for a Copa Sudamericana victory over Atlético Tucumán on 29 October, the central midfielder made his senior debut days later in a Copa de la Liga Profesional win away to Central Córdoba on 1 November.

Career statistics
.

Notes

References

External links

2000 births
Living people
People from Almirante Brown Partido
Argentine people of Italian descent
Argentine footballers
Association football midfielders
Club Atlético Independiente footballers
Sportspeople from Buenos Aires Province